is a former Japanese football player.

Playing career
Sugano was born in Mie Prefecture on August 8, 1971. After graduating from Chuo University, he joined Kashiwa Reysol in 1994. He played many matches as forward in 3 seasons. In 1997, he moved to Kawasaki Frontale. However he could hardly play in the match. In 2000, he moved to newly was promoted to J2 League club, Mito HollyHock. He played many matches as left side back and left midfielder. In October 2001, he moved to Prefectural Leagues club Gunma FC Fortona (later Gunma FC Horikoshi). The club was promoted to Regional Leagues in 2003 and Japan Football League in 2004. He retired end of 2004 season.

Club statistics

References

External links

1971 births
Living people
Chuo University alumni
Association football people from Mie Prefecture
Japanese footballers
J1 League players
J2 League players
Japan Football League (1992–1998) players
Japan Football League players
Kashiwa Reysol players
Kawasaki Frontale players
Mito HollyHock players
Arte Takasaki players
Association football defenders